The King's School, Rochester, is an independent co-educational day and boarding school in Rochester, Kent. It is a cathedral school and, being part of the foundation of Rochester Cathedral, the Dean of Rochester serves as chair of the school's governing body. The school claims to be the second oldest continuously operating school in the world, having been founded in 604 AD.

History
The cathedral school in Rochester was founded in 604 AD, at the same time as the cathedral. It was refounded by Henry VIII in 1541 during the English Reformation when the monastery in Rochester was dissolved. It is the second oldest school in the United Kingdom after The King's School Canterbury. The current principal is Ben Charles, who also acts as the senior school headmaster. Tom Morgan is the preparatory school headmaster and Kellie Crozer is the acting headmistress of the nursery and Pre-Preparatory school.

Site

The school is housed in a variety of buildings around Rochester (the school also uses Rochester Cathedral for school services).

Senior school

Satis House 

A 16th-century town house rebuilt as an 18th-century Georgian house, the school took it over in 1950 and purchased it outright in 1968. It had originally been built for Richard Watts who had entertained Queen Elizabeth I there in 1573: asked for her verdict on her stay, the Queen had answered, "satis" (from the Latin  for "enough"), hence the name of the house. Above the entrance portico is a 1578 bust of Watts who represented Rochester in Parliament between 1563 and 1571. At Satis House are the office of the principal of King's Rochester, administrative offices and the senior school Library.

Main school 

The oldest building in use which was specifically built for the school. It was completed in 1742, the tower and additional classrooms were added in 1880 and the building extended with porches either end in 1913. During WW2 the building was commandeered for ARP purposes. The wooden roof which had served as the school's assembly hall was removed in 1976. In 1985, it became the Design and Technology Centre. At the entrance are the Parker Memorial Gates (after the Reverend William Parker, headmaster 1913-35) which were dedicated in 1955.

Cheetham Memorial Building 

This was opened in 1909 by Richard Glazebrook, director of the National Physical Laboratory. It originally consisted of a science laboratory and an art room and now contains two computing suites. The Venerable Samuel Cheetham was Archdeacon of Rochester from 1882 until his death in 1908.

Laboratory and lecture theatre 

The building was opened in 1952 and was the school's first new building for nearly 40 years. Further adjacent science laboratories for chemistry and physics were opened in 1959 and the biology wing in 1980.

College 

Built in 1640, this was the deanery from 1661 to 1961. The building was home to the Rochester Theological College (founded by Bishop Christopher Chavasse) from 1961 until its closure in 1970. It then became in part the King's School Sixth Form Centre with the senior school history and geography departments.

Mackean House 

This was built in 1840 and later named after the last canon of the cathedral to live there, Canon William Herbet Mackean (1877-1960), Canon of Rochester 1925-58. The headmaster's study and the senior school were housed there until both were relocated Satis House in 1986. The property is marked on early maps as the house of the second prebend. During World War 2 the house was used for ARP purposes and is now used by the senior school English, economics and business studies departments.

Davies Court 

Opened in 1982 by the Archbishop of York and named after Ernest William Davies (headmaster 1935-57), it houses the school's art, religious studies and language centres (French, German and Russian). Memorial gates at the entrance from the Vines were dedicated in 2006.

Old St Margaret's 

Originally a Richard Watts charitable school (as per the plaque on the façade explains), this is the oldest building in the towns of the Lower Medway in continuous educational use. As a Church of England primary school, St Margaret’s, it was taken over by King's School in 1960 and purchased outright in 1968. It is used by the senior school mathematics and classics departments. Parts of the building and outbuildings house the offices of the school's Combined Cadet Force which celebrated its centenary in 2011.

School hall 

This was opened and dedicated by the Archbishop of Canterbury in 1967. It is regularly used to host school productions, assemblies and other events. It is due to be renovated in mid 2018.

Bob Doubles 

Named after a method of change ringing on five bells. This is the school's café and tuck shop and occupies the former stables of Prior Gate's House.

King's Rochester Sports Centre 

A joint venture with Medway Council, the King's Rochester Sports Centre was officially opened in June 2014 and provides among its modern facilities, netball and tennis courts and a gymnasium which are also available to the general public. The school also has a Boathouse by Allington Lock near Aylesford on the River Medway which opened in 1984. The school has a long rowing tradition with the King's School Rochester Boat Club being founded in 1861.

Preparatory School
The main building was opened in 1958, extended in 1984 and with a new wing added in 1992. The part of King's Rochester was called the Junior School until 1989.

St Nicholas House

The late Victorian former vicarage for St Nicholas Church, was purchased in 1946 and used as the Junior School until the new buildings were opened in 1958. From 1958 until 1974 it was a boarding house and now contains Preparatory School administrative offices. Adjacent to St Nicholas House was a wartime decontamination shelter which had been converted to Junior School changing rooms. An additional floor and gabled roof were added in 2000 and opened that year in memory of David Dann (King's Scholar 1942-52) and a Governor of the school, to provide additional music facilities.

Rookwood

Previously used as a Junior School boarding house, as the first site of the Pre-Preparatory School (opened in 1988) and for the Nursery School and is now used for general teaching. From 1946 to 1961 it was the Headmaster's house.

St Ronan's

Built in 1908, acquired in 1948 and now used as a supplementary boarding house until boarding capacity at School House was increased in 1972 and now houses the Music Department.

The Pavilion

Situated above a bank on the west side of the paddock. The original building was created in 1905. An extension to the north, later called the Colours Room, was added in 1920 in memory of Major Maurice Miskin (1903–10), who was killed in action in 1918. The 25m Rifle Range immediately to the south and used by the Combined Cadet Force was built in 1926.

Conference Centre

Opened in 2006, the Conference Centre consists of a small hall on the ground floor and a basement used as a dining hall for the Preparatory and Pre-Preparatory Schools.

Pre-Preparatory School
Chadlington House

King's Rochester Pre-Preparatory School was opened in 2000 and named Chadlington House after Old Roffensian life peer Peter Gummer (Lord Chadlington). This modern building also now houses King's Nursery School. In 2017 'Armadilla Pods' were constructed in the grounds for music lessons.

Houses

Senior School

Headteachers

Senior school

Preparatory school

Pre-preparatory school

Notable former pupils

Sir Edwin Arnold, poet and author
Sir Derek Barton, Nobel Prize-winning chemist
James Hadley Chase, One of the best known detective/thriller authors
Michael Brown, Archdeacon of Nottingham
Richard Dadd, artist
Edward Mortlock Donaldson, World War II flying ace
Christopher Gabbitas, singer with the King's Singers
Michael S. K. Grant, IT professional and resident of the BCS
John Griffiths, Warden of Wadham College, Oxford
John Gummer, former Conservative cabinet minister
Peter Gummer, Baron Chadlington, Conservative peer
Richard Keen, lawyer and Conservative Party politician
David Clive King, author
Dinsdale Landen, actor
Harold Stephen Langhorne, Brigadier-General in the Royal Army Ordnance Corps
Geoffrey Lees, cricketer and educator
G. R. S. Mead, author and member of the Theosophical Society
Peter Rogers, film producer
Simon Shackleton, musician from Lunatic Calm
John Storrs, Dean of Rochester
Pete Tong, BBC Radio 1 disc jockey
Sir Cecil Wakeley, 1st Baronet, surgeon
Matthew Walker, professional cricketer, Kent Cricket coach (2017–present)
Martin Warner, Bishop of Chichester
Michael Wilkes, Adjutant-General to the Forces
Douglas Wilson, Bishop of Trinidad

See also
List of the oldest schools in the world

References
Footnotes

Citations

External links
Official website
Choristers origins in 7th Century
Order of St Justus

KingsSchool
Private schools in Medway
Educational institutions established in the 7th century
604 establishments
Member schools of the Headmasters' and Headmistresses' Conference
Co-educational boarding schools
Boarding schools in Kent
7th-century establishments in England
Choir schools in England
Church of England private schools in the Diocese of Rochester